Patty Paine (born May 17, 1965) is an American poet, author and scholar from Vernon, New Jersey based in Doha, Qatar. Paine's writing has appeared or is forthcoming in Thrush, Blackbird (journal), The Adroit Journal, Gulf Stream Magazine, Muse/A Journal, and others. Paine is the author of five works of poetry: Grief & Other Animals (Accents Publishing, 2015), The Sounding Machine (Accents Publishing, 2012), City of Small Fires (Hysterical Books, 2018), Feral (Imaginary Friend Press, 2012), Elegy & Collapse (Finishing Line Press, 2006); and is the co-editor of  two anthologies of Arabian literature. In 2007, Paine established Diode Poetry Journal and later founded the small press Diode Editions in 2012. At Virginia Commonwealth University - Qatar, Paine is an Associate Professor and Director of Liberal Arts and Sciences.

Published works

Authored works

Books 
 Grief & Other Animals. Accents Publishing. 2015 
 The Sounding Machine. Accents Publishing. 2012.

Chapbooks 
 City of Small Fires. Hysterical Books. 2018.
 Feral. Imaginary Friend Press. 2012.
 Elegy & Collapse. Finishing Line Press. 2006.

Select poems 
"The Taxidermist Takes on an Apprentice," Verse Daily, 7 July 2018. 
"Call and Response," The Adroit Journal, Issue 13.
"what we made by looking," Waxwing, Issue 12, 2017. 
"a place that bears no scar," Thrush, July 2017.
"Memento Mori" and "Vanishing [the window’s lament]," Muse/A Journal, 2016.
"What Light Does," Blackbird v14n2, 2015.
"Dogs," Umbrella Journal, 2007.
"Notes On Mirrors, Already Lost ||| OCHO #16," The Literary Review.
"Purple, A Morphology" and "i don't want," pioneertown.
"this is the nature of that country," AMP Magazine Issue 2.

Select prose

Nonfiction 
 "Review | The View from Zero Bridge, by Lynn Aarti Chandhok." Blackbird v8n1. 2016

Interviews 
 Abani, C. "A Conversation with Chris Abani." Blackbird v8n1. 2009.

Edited works

Anthologies 
Paine, Patty, and Samia Touati, eds. Gathering the Tide: An Anthology of Contemporary Arabian Gulf Poetry. Garnet Publishing & Ithaca Press. 2012. 
Paine, Patty, Jesse Ulmer, and Michael Hersrud, eds. The Donkey Lady and Other Tales from the Arabian Gulf. Berkshire Academic Press. 2013.

Select translations 
Al Kuwari, Soad. "The Flood." Trans. Fatima Mostafawi with Patty Paine. Blackbird v9n2, 2010.
Al Kuwari, Soad. "Modernity in the Desert." Trans. Sara Al Qatami with Patty Paine. Blackbird v9n2, 2010.
Al Sindi, Fawzia. "from Less Than Ink." Trans. Bahaa-eddin M. Mazid with Patty Paine. Blackbird v9n2, 2010.
Mufarreh, Saadia. "Soon She Will Leave." Trans. Hend Mubarek Aleidan with Patty Paine. Blackbird v9n2, 2010.
Tarkovsky, Arseny. "Here, a house once stood." Trans. Philip Metres and Dimitri Psurtsev. Ed. Patty Paine. Diode Poetry Journal v7n3, 2014.

Awards and honors 
 2015 INDIEFAB Book of the Year Award Finalist for Grief & Other Animals (Accents Publishing, 2015)
 2014 THE WARDROBE’S BEST DRESSED: PATTY PAINE’S “FERAL” 
 2013 Distinguished Achievement for Service Award, VCUarts Qatar
 2011 Winner of the Accents Publishing International Poetry Book Contest for The Sounding Machine (Accents Publishing, 2012) 
 2010 Distinguished Achievement in Research Awards, VCUarts Qatar
 2007 AWP Intro Journal Award
 2007 Catherine and Joane Byrne Poetry Prize

Select reviews 
 "Chapbook Reviews II: Patty Paine, Cecily Parks, Barbara Tran, Catherine Pierce, and John Allman." Anna Journey. Blackbird v5n2. 2006.
 "Review | The Sounding Machine, by Patty Paine." Catherine MacDonald. Blackbird v11n2. 2012. 
 "Review | Feral, by Patty Paine." Emilia Phillips. Blackbird v11n1. 2012.
 "Review | Grief & Other Animals, by Patty Paine." Laura Van Prooyen. Blackbird v12n2. 2016.

Interviews 
Doallas, Maureen and Patty Paine. "Interview with Poet Patty Paine (Part 1): Write Fearlessly." tweetspeak: the best in poetry & poetic things. 2014.
Duotrope and Patty Paine. "Editor Interview: diode poetry journal." Duotrope. 12 January 2012.
 McCurry, Christopher and Patty Paine. "Patty Paine on Grief & Other Animals." Accents Publishing Blog. 28 September 2015.
McCurry, Christopher and Patty Paine. "Plunging into the Depths to Measure." Public Republic. 6 May 2013.
Montesano, Keith and Patty Paine. "#63 - Patty Paine." First Book Interviews: Continuing the Tradition of Kate Greenstreet. 25 January 2013. 
 Schubert, Karen and Patty Paine. "Meet the Press: Karen Schubert in Conversation with Patty Paine, Editor of Diode Editions." Best American Poetry Blog. 13 December 2014.

Panels 
Mattawa, Khaled, Patty Paine, and Jeff Lodge. "A Conversation with Khaled Mattawa." Blackbird v6n2. 2007.

References

External links
 Official Author Website

Living people
1965 births
People from New Jersey
Poets from New Jersey
21st-century American poets
American writers of Korean descent